Chak Hakim  is a village in Phagwara Tehsil in Kapurthala district of Punjab State, India. The village is administrated by a Sarpanch, who is an elected representative.

Demography 
According to the report published by Census India in 2011, Chak Hakim has 523 houses with the total population of 2,386 persons of which 1,339 are male and 1,047 females. Literacy rate of  Chak Hakim is 79.30%, higher than the state average of 75.84%.  The population of children in the age group 0–6 years is 241 which is 10.10% of the total population.  Child sex ratio is approximately 928, higher than the state average of 846.

Population data

Transport 
Phagwara Junction Railway Station,  Chiheru Railway Station are the very nearby railway stations to Chachoki however, Jalandhar City Rail Way station is 20 km away from the village.  The village is 114 km away from Sri Guru Ram Dass Jee International Airport in Amritsar and the another nearest airport is Sahnewal Airport  in Ludhiana which is located 43 km away from the village.

References

External links
  Villages in Kapurthala
 Kapurthala Villages List

Villages in Kapurthala district